Calytrix praecipua is a species of plant in the myrtle family Myrtaceae that is endemic to Western Australia.

It usually blooms between June and November producing pink-white star-shaped flowers.

Found on breakaways and among outcrops in a scattered area through the Mid West and Goldfields-Esperance regions of Western Australia where it grows on skeletal sandy soils over laterite or granite.
 
The species was first formally described by the botanist Lyndley Craven in 1987 in the article A taxonomic revision of Calytrix Labill. (Myrtaceae) in the journal Brunonia.

References

Plants described in 1987
praecipua
Flora of Western Australia